Anthony Compagno (January 29, 1921 – April 8, 1971) was an American football fullback who played three seasons with the Pittsburgh Steelers of the National Football League. He was drafted by the Pittsburgh Steelers in the 21st round of the 1943 NFL Draft. He played college football at Saint Mary's College of California and attended Jefferson High School in Daly City, California.

References

External links
Just Sports Stats

1921 births
1971 deaths
Players of American football from California
American football fullbacks
Saint Mary's Gaels football players
Sportspeople from the San Francisco Bay Area
Pittsburgh Steelers players
People from Daly City, California